Panagiotis Macheras (born 12 September 1976) is a retired Greek football defender.

References

1976 births
Living people
Enosi Panaspropyrgiakou Doxas players
Ethnikos Piraeus F.C. players
Panelefsiniakos F.C. players
Marko F.C. players
Chaidari F.C. players
Atromitos F.C. players
Patraikos F.C. players
Ethnikos Asteras F.C. players
Levadiakos F.C. players
Diagoras F.C. players
Ilisiakos F.C. players
Association football defenders
Super League Greece players
Footballers from Athens
Greek footballers